A gas emission crater is recent arctic phenomenon where melting permafrost releases enormous volumes of trapped gas in an explosive event.

The holes were first spotted in 2013. Meanwhile, the first known crater "Yamal crater" (ru) in Yamal Peninsula was discovered in the summer of 2014; later, several dozen with more similar landforms were discovered. Soon it was proposed to call them in the scientific literature as "Gas emission craters". Known craters are located in the circumpolar regions of Western Siberia on land, on the bottom of rivers and lakes.

The nature of the formation of these formations is still being studied, the reasons and mechanism of their formation are unclear, but most researchers agree in the opinion that their formation most likely occurs under the influence of fluid-dynamic processes in permafrost, which lead to the appearance of zones of accumulation of free natural gas near the surface. In this case, when the reservoir pressure of the accumulated gas fluids exceeds the pressure of the overlying strata, an avalanche-like outburst of gas-saturated rocks may occur. Other researchers consider this phenomenon as consistent with the definition of cryovolcanism.

See also
Arctic methane release

References

External links
 
 

Explosion craters